The 1931 New Year Honours were appointments by King George V to various orders and honours to reward and highlight good works by citizens of the United Kingdom and British Empire. They were announced on 30 December 1930.

The recipients of honours are displayed here as they were styled before their new honour, and arranged by honour, with classes (Knight, Knight Grand Cross, etc.) and then divisions (Military, Civil, etc.) as appropriate.

United Kingdom and Colonies

Baron
Sir John Scott Hindley  Commercial Adviser, Mines Department since 1918. For public services.
Sir Ernest Henry Lamb  Member of Parliament for Rochester 1906-1910 arid 1910-18. Member of the City of London Corporation since 1903. For public and political services.
Sir William Plender  Senior Partner of Deloitte, Plender, Griffiths & Co. A past President of the Institute of Chartered Accountants. High Sheriff of Kent, 1928-29. For public services.
Sir Ernest Rutherford  Chairman of the Advisory Council of the Committee of the Privy Council for Scientific and Industrial Research, late President of the Royal Society. For public services.

Privy Councillor
The King appointed the following to His Majesty's Most Honourable Privy Council:
Thomas Kennedy  Parliamentary Secretary to the Treasury since 1929. Member of Parliament for Kirkcaldy 1921-22 and since 1923.
Herbert Stanley Morrison  Minister of Transport since 1929. Member of Parliament for South Hackney 1923-24 and since 1929.
The Honourable Sir George Halsey Perley  Minister without Portfolio, Dominion of Canada.

Baronetcies
Sir John Rose Bradford  President of the Royal College of Physicians, Consulting Physician to University College Hospital.
Ernest Ridley Debenham, A Director of Lloyds Bank and of the Royal Exchange Assurance Corporation. For services to agriculture.
Sir Richard Arman Gregory  Emeritus Professor of Astronomy, Queen's College, London. Editor of Nature.
Sir George Ernest May  Secretary to the Prudential Assurance Company. Member of the Council of the Institute of Actuaries.
George Roberts (Audax). A generous contributor to charity.

Knight Bachelor
Ralph Norman Angell  Member of Parliament for North Bradford since May, 1929. For public and political services.
Professor Charles Raymond Beazley  Professor of Mediaeval and Modern History in the University of Birmingham.
Henry James Buckland, General Manager of the Crystal Palace.
John Caulcutt, Deputy Chairman, Export Credits Guarantee Advisory Committee.
(Edward) Percival Clarke, Senior Prosecuting Counsel to the Crown at the Central Criminal Court.
Alfred Thomas Davies  Member of Parliament for the City of Lincoln 1918-24. For public and political services.
Arthur James Dawson  Lately Director of Education to the Durham County Education Authority.
William Alfred Cecil Goodchild  Assistant Delegate and General Secretary to the British Delegation, Reparations Commission.
Alderman Fred Hayward  For eight years Chairman of Central and United Boards of the Co-operative Union. For three years Chairman of the Parliamentary Committee of the Co-operative Congress. For public and political services.
Alfred Howarth. For many years Town Clerk of Preston.
Albert Edward Humphries  Chairman of the National Joint Industrial Council for the Flour Mailing Industry.
John Joseph Hunt  Member of the East Riding County Council. For public services and benefactions in the East Riding.
Alderman William Jenkins  Member of Parliament for the Neath Division since 1922. For public and political services.
His Honour Judge Thomas Artemus Jones  Formerly British Commissioner on the Mexican Claims Commission.
Ernest Gordon Graham Little  Member of Senate, University of London, since 1906.
Richard Winn Livingstone  Vice-Chancellor of the Queen's University, Belfast.
John Blackwood McEwen  Principal of the Royal Academy of Music.
John David Morgan  For public and political services in Cardiff.
Conrad James Naef  Accountant-General of the Navy.
David John Owen, General Manager, Port of London Authority.
Henry Howard Piggott  Deputy Secretary, Ministry of Transport.
Hugh Stevenson Roberton, Founder and Conductor of the Glasgow Orpheus Choir.
Professor William Rothenstein  Principal, Royal College of Art. For several years Professor of Civic Art, Sheffield University.
James Sexton  Member of Parliament for St. Helens since 1918. Member of the General Council of the Trades Union Congress since 1923. For public and political services.
Major Robert Inigo Tasker  Chairman of the London County Council.
Daniel Lleufer Thomas  For many years Stipendiary Magistrate for Pontypridd and Rhondda.
James Smith Whitaker  Senior Medical Officer, Ministry of Health.
Herbert William Wrangham Wilberforce, Deputy Chairman, County of London Sessions. Chairman and past President of the All England Lawn Tennis Club.
Ambrose Edgar Woodall  Medical Superintendent of the Manor House Hospital, Golders Green.
Robert Young  Chairman of Committees, House of Commons, since 1929. Member of Parliament for the Newton Division of Lancashire since 1918. For public and political services.

Dominions
The Honourable Tasker Keech Cook. Member of the Executive Council and of the Legislative Council of Newfoundland.
Arthur Dudley Dobson  For services in the Dominion of New Zealand.
Colonel Alexander Weston Jarvis  Chairman of the Council of the Royal Empire Society.
Cecil Leys, of the City of Auckland. For services in the Dominion of New Zealand.

British India
Justice John William Fisher Beaumont  Barrister-at-Law, Chief Justice in the High Court of Judicature, Bombay.
Rai Bahadur Lala Sita Ram  President, Legislative Council, United Provinces.
Ali Muhammad Khan Dehlavi, Barrister-at-Law, President of the recently prorogued Legislative Council, Bombay.
Justice Hubert Grayhurst Pearson, Barrister-at-Law, Puisne Judge of the High Court of Judicature at Fort William in Bengal.
Khan Bahadur Mirza Zaffar Ali, Punjab Civil Service (retired), lately Puisne Judge of the High Court of Judicature at Lahore, Punjab.
Alexander Robert Loftus Tottenham  Indian Civil Service, Senior Member, Central Board of Revenue, Government of India.
Ralph Oakden  Indian Civil Service, Senior Member, Board of Revenue, United Provinces.
Francis Charles Griffith  Indian Police Service, Inspector-General of Police, Bombay.
Charles Stead  Indian Police Service, Inspector-General of Police, Punjab.
Percy Rothera  Agent, South Indian Railway, Madras.
Maurice George Simpson  Director-in-Chief, Indo-European Telegraph Department.
Khan Bahadur Qazi Aziz-ud-din Ahmad  Dewan, Datia State, Central India.
Oscar de Glanville  Barrister-at-Law, Burma.
Kikabhai Premchand, Banker, Bombay.
Charles Edgar Wood, Senior Partner of Messrs. Parry and Company, Madras.
Thomas Dugald Edelston, lately Senior Partner of Messrs. Begg, Dunlop and Company Ltd., Calcutta.

Colonies, Protectorates, etc.
Herbert Layard Dowbiggin  Inspector-General of Police, Ceylon.
Lancelot Henry Elphinstone, Chief Justice of the Federated Malay States.
William Woodward Hornell  Vice-Chancellor of Hong Kong University.
Sidney Orme Rowan-Hamilton, Chief Justice of Bermuda.

The Most Honourable Order of the Bath

Knight Grand Cross of the Order of the Bath (GCB)

Military Division

Army
General Sir Robert Dundas Whigham  Colonel, The Royal Warwickshire Regiment, Aide-de-Camp General to The King, General Officer Commanding-in-Chief, Eastern Command.

Civil Division
Sir Oswyn Alexander Ruthven Murray  Permanent Secretary, Admiralty.

Knight Commander of the Order of the Bath (KCB)
Military Division
Royal Navy
Vice-Admiral William Archibald Howard Kelly  
Engineer Vice-Admiral Reginald William Skelton 

Army
Lieutenant-General Harold Ben Fawcus  (late Royal Army Medical Corps), Director-General, Army Medical Services, The War Office.

Civil Division
Sir Edward Hall Alderson  Clerk of the Parliaments.
Frank Edward Smith  Secretary to the Committee of the Privy Council for Scientific and Industrial Research. Secretary to the Royal Society.
Reginald Townsend  Director of Ordnance Factories.

Companion of the Order of the Bath (CB)
Military Division
Royal Navy
Captain (Commodore 2nd Class) Henry Stockwell  (Retired). 
Instructor Captain John Camp 

Army
Major-General Lawrence Humphry  (late Royal Army Medical Corps), Deputy Director of Medical Services, Western Command, India.
Colonel (temporary Brigadier) Alexander Duncan Macpherson  (late The Queen's Own Cameron Highlanders), Commander, Canal Brigade, The British Troops in Egypt.
Colonel (temporary Brigadier) Reginald Francis Arthur Hobbs  (late Royal Engineers), Brigadier in charge of Administration, Western Command.
Colonel (temporary Brigadier) Verney Asser  (late Royal Artillery), Commander, Royal Artillery,. 4th Division, Eastern Command.
Colonel (temporary Brigadier) Arthur Cecil Temperley  (late The Norfolk Regiment), Deputy Director of Military Operations and Intelligence, The War Office.
Colonel (Honorary Brigadier) Hamlet Bush Toller  Retired pay (late Royal Army Pay Corps), late Chief Paymaster at The War Office, and Officer in Charge of Records, Royal Army Pay Corps.
Major General Hugh Francis Edward MacMahon  Indian Army, Director of Supplies and Transport, Headquarters Staff of the Army in India.
Colonel (temporary Brigadier) Sidney Bernard Orton, Indian Army, Commander, Allahabad Brigade Area, Lucknow District, India.
Colonel (temporary Brigadier) Henry Clare Duncan  Indian Army, Commander, Zhob (Independent) Brigade Area, Western Command, India.
Colonel Bryan Norman Abbay, Indian Army, late Commandant, 18th King, Edward's Own Cavalry, Indian Army.

Royal Air Force
Air Commodore Patrick Henry Lyon Playfair 

Civil Division
Colonel Cuthbert Buckle  Territorial Army.
Captain the Honourable Bede Edmund Hugh Clifford  Imperial Secretary, South African High Commission, and Representative in the Union of South Africa of His Majesty's Government in the United Kingdom.
James William Henry Culling  Director of Victualling, Admiralty.
Henry Arthur Augustus Ellis, A Senior Clerk in the House of Commons.
Ioan Gwilym Gibbon  Principal Assistant Secretary, Ministry of Health.
Rear-Admiral Theodore John Hallett 
Robert Lockhart Hobson, Keeper of Ceramics and Ethnography, British Museum.
Major and Brevet Lieutenant-Colonel Hastings Lionel Ismay  Sam Browne's Cavalry (12th Frontier Force), Indian Army. Lately Senior Assistant Secretary, Committee of Imperial Defence.
George Augustus Mounsey  Assistant Under-Secretary of State, Foreign Office.
Lucius Abel John Granville Ram  Second Parliamentary Counsel.
Alfred Edward Stamp  Deputy Keeper of the Public Records and Keeper of the Land Revenue Records.
Rear-Admiral John Knowles im Thurn

The Most Exalted Order of the Star of India

Knight Grand Commander (GCSI)
His Highness Maharajadhiraja Maharana Sir Bhupal Singh Bahadur  Maharaja. of Udaipur, Rajputana.
Lieutenant-Colonel His Highness Shri Sir Rajaram Chhatrapati Maharaj  Maharaja of Kolhapur, Bombay Presidency.

Honorary Knight Grand Commander
Major-General His Highness Projjwal-Nepal Tara-Dhish Sri Sri Sri Maharaja Sir Bhim Shumsher Jang Bahadur Rana  Prime Minister and Supreme Commander-in-Chief of Nepal.

Knight Commander (KCSI)
Lieutenant His Highness Raja Jogindar Sen Bahadur, Raja of Mandi, Punjab States.
Thakor Saheb Shri Sir Daulatsinhji Jasvatsinhji  Thakor Saheb of Limbdi, Western India States.
Sir Norman Edward Marjoribanks  Indian Civil Service (retired), Chairman, Madras Services Commission, Madras.

Companion (CSI)
Hugh Kynaston Briscoe  Indian Civil Service, Chief Secretary to the Government of Bihar and Orissa.
Thomas Couper, Indian Civil Service, Member of the Executive Council of the Governor of Burma.
Charles Banks Cunningham, Indian Police Service, Inspector-General of Police, Madras.
Joseph Hugh Garrett, Indian Civil Service, Acting Commissioner, Northern Division, Bombay.
Nawab Malik Muhammad Hayat Khan, Nun, Punjab Civil Service Commissioner, Lahore, Punjab.
Courtenay Latimer  Indian Civil Service, Political Department, Officiating Revenue Commissioner, and Deputy Chief Commissioner, North-West Frontier Province.
Thomas Henry Morony  Indian Police Service, Inspector-General of Police, Central Provinces.
Kunwar Jagdisb Prasad  Indian Civil Service, Chief Secretary to the Government of the United Provinces.
Sir Charles Augustus Tegart  Indian Police Service, Commissioner of Police, Calcutta, Bengal.
Gilbert Wiles  Indian Civil Service, Secretary to the Government of Bombay, Finance Department.

The Most Distinguished Order of Saint Michael and Saint George

Knight Grand Cross of the Order of St Michael and St George (GCMG)
The Right Honourable Sir Francis Oswald Lindley  His Majesty's Ambassador Extraordinary and Plenipotentiary at Lisbon.
Sir Robert Gilbert Vansittart  Permanent Under-Secretary of State for Foreign Affairs.

Honorary Knight Grand Cross
His Highness Tuanku Muhammad  ibni almerhum Yam Tuan Antah, Yang di-pertuan Besar of the Negri Sembilan, Federated Malay States.

Knight Commander of the Order of St Michael and St George (KCMG)
Sir Harry Gloster Armstrong  His Majesty's Consul-General at New York.
Sir Harry Fagg Batterbee  Assistant Under-Secretary of State, Dominions Office.
Sir Edward Brandis Denham  Governor and Commander-in-Chief of the Colony of British Guiana.
William Meyrick Hewlett  His Majesty's Consul-General at Nanking.
Arthur William Hill  Director of the Royal Botanic Gardens, Kew.
The Honourable Sir Walter Hartwell James  Chancellor of the University of Western Australia. For services in that State.
Lancelot Oliphant  Assistant Under-Secretary of State, Foreign Office.
Sir William Peel  Governor and Commander-in-Chief of the Colony of Hong Kong.
The Honourable Ernest Stowell Scott  lately His Majesty's Envoy Extraordinary and Minister Plenipotentiary at Montevideo.
Thomas Shenton Whitelegge Thomas  Governor and Commander-in-Chief of the Nyasaland Protectorate.

Companion of the Order of St Michael and St George (CMG)
George Sinclair Browne, Senior Resident, Northern Provinces, Nigeria.
Alexander Crabb, Secretary, Office of the High Commissioner in London for the Dominion of New Zealand.
Cecil Moore Dobbs  Provincial Commissioner, Kenya.
Charles Henry Hart-Davis, Commissioner, Colony of Cyprus.
Charles Henry Hutchings  Inspector-General of Constabulary, Newfoundland.
James Lornie, British Resident, Selangor, Federated Malay States.
Reginald Marquand, lately Controller of European Administration, Ministry of Education, Egypt.
Thomas Millard, Treasurer, Colony of British Guiana.
Thomas Joseph Morris, His Majesty's Envoy Extraordinary and Minister Plenipotentiary (local rank) at Havana.
Charles William Orde, Counsellor in the Foreign Office.
Major Arthur Charles Cosmo Parkinson  Assistant Secretary, Colonial Office.
Owen Surtees Phillpotts  Commercial Secretary at His Majesty's Legation at Vienna.
Thomas Reid, of the Ceylon Civil Service.
Montague John Rendall  Chairman of the School Empire-Tour Committee.
Henry Tom  His Majesty's Consul-General at Antwerp.
George Alexander Troup, Mayor of Wellington. For public services in the Dominion of New Zealand.
Oswald White, His Majesty's Consui-General at Seoul.

Order of the Indian Empire

Knight Grand Commander (GCIE)
His Highness Maharajadhiraj Sir Gulab Singh Bahadur  Maharaja of Rewa, Central India.
Lieutenant-Colonel His Highness Rais-ud-Daula Sipahdar-ul-Mulk, Maharajadhiraj Sri Sawai Maharaj Rana Sir Udaibhan Singh Lokindar Bahadur Diler Jang Jai Deo  Maharaj Rana of Dholpur, Rajputana.
His Highness Nawab Sir Mahabat Khanji III Rasul Khanji  Nawab of Junagadh, Western India States.

Knight Commander (KCIE)
Steuart Edmund Pears  Indian Civil Service, Political Department, Chief Commissioner and Agent to the Governor General, North West Frontier Province.
Samuel Andrew Smyth  Indian Civil Service, lately Member of the Executive Council of the Governor of Burma.

Companion (CIE)
John Ackroyd Woodhead, Indian Civil Service, Secretary to the Government of India, Commerce Department.
Gordon Sidney Hardy, Indian Civil Service, Acting Member, Central Board of Revenue, Government of India.
Walter Booth-Gravely, Indian Civil Service, Commissioner, Pegu Division, Burma.
Eyre Gordon, Indian Civil Service, Officiating Chief Secretary to the Government of the Central Provinces.
William Alexander Cosgrave, Indian Civil Service, Officiating Chief Secretary to the Government of Assam.
Godfrey Ferdinando Stratford Collins  Indian Civil Service, Secretary to the Government of Bombay, Home Department.
Alexander Cassells, Indian Civil Service, Secretary to the Government of Bengal, Finance Department.
James Augustine Sweeney, Indian Civil Service, Judicial Secretary and Legal Remembrancer to the Government of Bihar and Orissa.
Captain Hector Boyes  Royal Navy, lately Senior Naval Officer in the Persian Gulf.
Major Eric Edward Doyle  Indian Medical Service, Inspector-General of Prisons, Bombay.
Rai Bahadur Sarat Chandra Banerjee, President, Calcutta Improvement Trust Tribunal, Bengal.
William Leonard Stampe, Indian Service of Engineers, Superintending Engineer, Public Works Department, United Provinces.
Ronald Evelyn Leslie Wingate, Indian Civil Service, Political Department, lately Political. Agent and Deputy Commissioner, Quetta-Peshin District, Baluchistan.
Major Harold Wilberforce-Bell, Indian Army, Political Department, Deputy Secretary to the Government of India, Foreign and Political Department.
William Hawthorne Lewis, Indian Civil Service, Officer; on Special Duty in the Reforms Office, Government of India.
Lieutenant-Colonel Jasper Robert Joly Tyrrell  Indian Medical Service, Chief Medical Officer in Central India.
Mukund Lai Pasricha, Deputy Director-General, Telegraphs.
Brevet Lieutenant-Colonel Hastings Lionel Ismay  lately Assistant Secretary, Committee of Imperial Defence.
Francis Holy Burkitt  Indian Service of Engineers, Superintending Engineer, Public Works Department, Punjab.
Frederick Theodore Jones  Indian Service of Engineers, Superintending Engineer, Public Works Department, Delhi.
Lieutenant-Colonel Hugh William Acton, Indian Medical Service, Director, School of Tropical Medicine and Hygiene, Calcutta.
Lieutenant-Colonel (Honorary Colonel) Horace Craigie Manders  Auxiliary Force, India, Commandant, Assam Valley Light Horse, A.F.I.
Captain Thomas Wynford Rees  Indian Army, lately Private Secretary to His Excellency the Governor of Burma.
Claude Francis Strickland, Indian Civil Service (retired), recently Registrar, Co-operative Credit Societies, Punjab.
Gordon Herbert Ramsay Halland  Indian Police Service, Senior Superintendent of Police, Punjab.
Rai Bahadur Seray Mal Bapna, Prime Minister to His Highness the Maharaja Holkar of Indore, Central India.
George Hemming Spence, Indian Civil Service, Joint Secretary and Draftsman to the Government of India, Legislative Department.
Birendra Nath De, Indian Civil Service, Officiating Commissioner, Berar Division, Central Provinces.
Frederick Charles Isemonger  Indian Police Service, lately Inspector-General of Police, North-West Frontier Province.
Lieutenant-Colonel Ian MacPherson MacRae  Indian Medical Service, Inspector-General of Prisons, Bihar and Orissa.
Hugh Bomford, Indian Civil Service, Magistrate and Collector, United Provinces.
Richard Harcourt Williamson, Indian Civil Service, Magistrate and Collector, United Provinces.
Alfred Master, Indian Civil Service, Collector and District Magistrate, Kaira, Bombay.
James Birch Brown, Indian Civil Service, Collector and District Magistrate, Madras.
Francis William Stewart  Indian Civil Service, Collector and District Magistrate, Madras.
Harry Vincent Braham, Indian Civil Service, Collector and District Magistrate, Surat, Bombay.
Herbert Rex Uzielli, Indian Civil Service, Collector and District Magistrate, Madras.
James Peddie, Indian Civil Service, Magistrate and Collector, Midnapore, Bengal.
James Alexander Dawson, Indian Civil Service, Deputy Commissioner, Sylhet, Assam.
George Alexander Shillidy, Indian Police Service, Deputy Inspector-General of Police, Northern Range, Ahmedabad, Bombay.
George Trevor Hamilton Harding, Indian Police Service, Senior Superintendent of Police, Lahore, Punjab.
Rai Bahadur Promode Chandra Dutta, Pleader, Assam.

The Royal Victorian Order

Knight Grand Cross of the Royal Victorian Order (GCVO)
Arnold Allan Cecil, Earl of Albemarle 
James Buchanan, Baron Woolavington.
Captain the Hon. Sir Seymour John Fortescue

Knight Commander of the Royal Victorian Order (KCVO)
Captain Sir Arthur Wellesley Clarke 
Harold Brakspear
Ashley Watson Mackintosh

Commander of the Royal Victorian Order (CVO)
Christopher Lloyd 
Arthur Gabriel Morrish 
Frederick Albert Minter
Walter Westley Russell

Member of the Royal Victorian Order, 4th class (MVO)
Lieutenant-Colonel Norman Gibb Scorgie 
Marcus Antonius Johnston de Lavis-Trafford 
Commander William Scott Bardwell  (dated 23 August 1930).
The Reverend Bernard Charles Spencer Everett
The Reverend Edmund Horace Fellowes

Member of the Royal Victorian Order, 5th class (MVO)
John William Hopkins
Arthur Walter Mills
Lewis Stainton
Joseph Hammond Whitehorn

Order of Merit (OM)

Admiral of the Fleet Sir Charles Edward Madden  in recognition of distinguished services rendered to his Country in Peace and War.
Philip Wilson Steer, in recognition of his eminent position in the World of Art, both as Painter and Teacher.

The Most Excellent Order of the British Empire

Dame Grand Cross of the Order of the British Empire (GBE)
Ishbel Maria, Marchioness of Aberdeen and Temair  President, International Council of Women, 1893-1899 and since 1904. President, Irish Industries Association. President, Women's National Health Association of Ireland.

Dame Commander of the Order of the British Empire (DBE)

Knight Commander of the Order of the British Empire (KBE)
Civil Division
Sir Alfred Edward Lewis, Director and Chief General Manager of the National Provincial Bank.
Willmott Lewis. Times correspondent in Washington.

British India
Major Nawab Muhammad Akbar Khan  of Hoti, Peshawar District, North-West Frontier Province.

Commander of the Order of the British Empire (CBE)
Military Division
Army
Colonel (temporary Brigadier) Lionel Arthur Fanshawe  Indian Army, Director of Ordnance Services, Army Headquarters, India.

Civil Division
William Barrowclough Brown, Principal Private Secretary to the President of the Board of Trade.
John Donovan  Secretary for the South Wales and Monmouthshire Area of the Transport and General Workers Union. Alderman of the Cardiff City Council and Chairman of the Health, Port Sanitary and Maternity and Child Welfare Committee. For public and political services.
Charles Edwards  A Lord Commissioner of the Treasury since 1929. Member of Parliament for Bedwellty since 1918.
Frank Minshull Elgood  Chairman of the National Housing and Town Planning Council. Joint Honorary Treasurer of the Church Army.
Caroline Haslett. Director, The Electrical Association for Women. Secretary of the Women's Engineering Society (Inc.)
Wesley Lambert. President of the Institute of British Foundrymen.
Frederick Walker Mackinney. For services in an advisory capacity to the Empire Marketing Board.
Edith Helen Major  Mistress of Girton College, Cambridge.
Louisa Martindale  President of the Medical Women's Federation and Vice-President of the Medical Women's International Association.
William Heathcote Unwin Napier, Controller of the London Telephone Service.
John Allen Parkinson  A Lord Commissioner of the Treasury since 1929. Member of Parliament for Wigan since 1918.
The Reverend Prebendary Edward de Montjoie Rudolf. Founder of the Church of England Waifs and Strays Society.
Professor Sidney Russ  Professor of Physics, Medical School, Middlesex Hospital. For work in connection with radium.
John Johnson Shaw, Seismologist. Secretary to the Seismological Section of the British Association.
John Stark  Assistant Commissioner of Police for the City of London.
Francis Bernard Stead, Chief Inspector of Secondary Schools, Board of Education.
James Hubert Taylor, Deputy Controller of Death Duties, Estate Duty Office, Board of Inland Revenue.
Major Ernest Blechynden Waggett  Honorary Consultant in diseases of the throat, nose and ear, to the Queen Alexandra Military Hospital.

British India
Lionel Burton Burrows, Bengal Civil Service, Magistrate and Collector, Mymensingh, Bengal.
Agnes Catherine Scott  Women's Medical Service, Chief Medical Officer and Secretary, Dufferin Funds. (Dated 15 December 1930.)
Philip Herbert Joseph Measures, Indian Police Service, Superintendent of Police, Allahabad, United Provinces.
Rai Bahadur Satya Charan Mukherjee  Zamindar, Hooghly District, Bengal. (Dated 15 December 1930.)

Colonies, Protectorates, etc.
William Waddel, Superintendent, State Advances Department, Dominion of New Zealand.

Diplomatic Service And Overseas List
Lieutenant-Colonel Francis Cecil Campbell Balfour  Governor, Mongalla Province, Sudan.
Walter Russell Brown  His Majesty's Consul-General at Hankow. 
Wilfred Hansford Gallienne, His Majesty's Consul at Santo Domingo.
George Alexander, President of the Court of Appeal, Ministry of Justice, Iraq.
Walter Bowerley, Auditor, Gold Coast.
Edward Carlyon Eliot, Administrator of Dominica, Leeward Islands.
Lucie Fairbanks, Lady McMillan. For philanthropic services in Kenya.

Honorary Commanders
Emir of Muri Muhammadu Mafindi, Emir of Muri, Nigeria.

Officer of the Order of the British Empire (OBE)
Military Division
Royal Navy
Lieutenant-Commander George William Field  (Retired). 
Lieutenant Sidney Thomas Morgan 

Army
Major Benjamin George Atkin  The Manchester Regiment, late Officer Commanding 2nd (Nyasaland) Battalion, The King's African Rifles, Tanganyika Territory.
Major Bertrand Lambert Drieberg, Ceylon Engineers; Ceylon Defence Force.
The Reverend John Percy Hales  (Chaplain to the Forces, Royal Army Chaplains Department, Territorial Army), retired.
Lieutenant-Colonel Samuel George Steele Haughton  Indian Medical Service, Officer Commanding Combined Indian Military Hospital, Kohat, India.
Major (Commissary) Edward McPoland, Indian Miscellaneous List, Officer Supervisor, Military Secretary's Branch, Army Headquarters, India.
Major (local Lieutenant-Colonel) John Howard Stafford  Royal Engineers; for services on the Anglo-Italian Somaliland Boundary Commission.
Captain and Brevet Lieutenant-Colonel William Henry Stanway  The South Wales Borderers, attached Auxiliary Force, India.
Major William Edward van Cutsem  Royal Engineers, General Staff Officer 2nd Grade, War Office.
Major Robert Henry Walsh  Royal Artillery, late Commandant, Eastern Arab Corps, Sudan Defence Force.
Lieutenant Joseph Waterson, Territorial Army Reserve of Officers, local Captain and Quartermaster, Nigeria Regiment, Royal West African Frontier Force.

Civil Division
Captain Walter Murray Ablewhite  Steward of the Bethlem Royal Hospital.
Ralph Allan Vice-Chairman of the Northumberland Public Assistance Committee.
John Hughes Ashley Chief Constable, Criminal Investigation Department, Metropolitan Police.
James Brown  Superintendent, Royal Ammunition Factories, Royal Arsenal, Woolwich.
Robert Stanley Capon, Superintendent of Scientific Research, Royal Aircraft Establishment, Air Ministry.
Joseph MacLeod Carey, H.M. Divisional Inspector of Mines.
George Harry Collinge, Chairman of the National Federation of Meat Traders (Mutual) Insurance Association. A Past President of the Executive Council of the National Federation of Meat Traders.
John Soden Corbett Secretary, Empire Forestry Association.
Captain William Redwood Davey. Head of the Prison Mission Department of the Church Army.
George Thomas Dixon, Livestock Commissioner, Ministry of Agriculture and Fisheries.
Charles Cleveland Ellis, Senior General Inspector of the Department of Health for Scotland.
John Bevan-Evans  Member of the National Savings Committee.
Francis Edward Forward  Class I Prison Medical Officer, Home Office.
James Hill  Chairman of the West Bromwich Smethwick and District War Pensions Committee.
Richard Pote-Hunt, Admiralty, Pilot on the Lower Yangtse. 
John Charles Innes, Member of the National Savings Committee.
George Kay, Assistant Accountant General, General Post Office.
Fred Kershaw  Financial Adviser for Trade Union Approved Societies. For Services in connexion with the Insurance side of Trade Union Work.
John King, Deputy Chief Ship Surveyor, Mercantile Marine Department, Board of Trade.
Joseph Legge  Chairman of the Willenhall Local Employment Committee.
Joan Stewart Hamon McCabe. Headmistress, Milham Ford Secondary School, Oxford.
George McKellar  Provost of Ardrossan. Some time Chairman of the Joint Hospital Committee for the Burghs of Ardrossan and Saltcoats.
Frank Richard Marten Assistant Solicitor, India Office.
Major Robert Walter Mellish. Judge of Alderney.
Alexander Morgan  A member of-the Scottish Savings Committee.
Theodora Matilda Morton. Late Principal Organiser of Children's Care Work under the London County Council.
Edward John Scarles, Collector, London Port, Board of Customs and Excise.
Frank Nevill Smith, Principal Private Secretary to the Minister of Pensions.
Agnes Elsie Diana Stewart (Agnes Herbert). For many years editor of the Artists and Writers Year Book. Member of the Council of the Society of Women Journalists.
Francis Timbrell, Chief Constable of the Borough of Bedford.
George Clifford Widdowson  Chief Quantity Surveyor, H.M. Office of Works.
Robert Bruce Wilson, Senior Inspector of Taxes, Board of Inland Revenue.
John Lade Worsfold, Clerk and Receiver to the Royal Hospitals, of Bridewell and Bethlem.

Diplomatic Service And Overseas List
Humphrey Ingelram Prideaux-Brune, One of His Majesty's Vice-Consuls in China.
Philip Lancelot Burnett. For services in connection with the Queen Victoria Memorial Hospital at Marseilles.
Robert Carey Griffiths, British Vice-Consul at Santa Cruz de Tenerife.
Ralph William Gordon Reed, Headmaster, Victoria College, Ramleh.
Arthur Patrick Thompson, Manager, Gash Board, Aroma.

Colonies, Protectorates, etc.
Vincent Patrick Burke  Deputy President, Bureau of Education, Newfoundland.
Captain George Benson Moseley. Resident Magistrate, Bechuanaland Protectorate.
William Mansfield Aders  lately Economic Biologist, Zanzibar.
Dorothy Martha Buckle, Principal of Raffles Girls School, Singapore.
Edgar William Carpenter, Senior Assistant to the Director of Public Works, Hong Kong.
John Coates, Government Printer, Uganda Protectorate.
The Reverend George Francis Graham-Brown  For services in Palestine.
Major Bernard Hill Horsley  Commissioner, Somaliland Protectorate.
Arthur Hutton McShine  Nominated Unofficial Member of the Legislative Council of Trinidad and Tobago. For public services.
John Edward Siegfried Merrick, Principal Assistant Colonial Secretary, Kenya.
Henry Morgan Monk, Collector of Customs and Excise, Ministry of Finance, Iraq.
Mehmet Munir Bey, Turkish Delegate of Evkaf, Cyprus, Member of the Executive Council, and lately Member of the Legislative Council of that Colony.
Nicholas-Julian Paterson  lately Attorney-General of Grenada, Windward Islands.
John Richard Cook Stephens  West African Medical Staff, Medical Officer, Nigeria.
James Strachan  Executive Engineer, Ministry of Irrigation and Agriculture, Iraq.
Armigel de Vins Wade, Principal Assistant in the Native Affairs Department, Kenya.

British India
Captain Hadji Dabiruddin Ahmad  Bengal Medical Service, Teacher of Anatomy, Campbell Medical School, Bengal. (Dated 15 December 1930.)
Godwin Edward Banwell  Indian Police Service, Officiating District Superintendent of Police, Pegu, Burma. (Dated 15 December 1930.)
Thomas Bertram  Superintendent, Viceregal Estates, Simla, Delhi, Calcutta and Dehra Dun.
Neville Bernard Deane, Indian Audit and Accounts Service, Accountant-General, Burma. (Dated 15 December 1930.)
Hubert St. Glair Freitas  Registrar, Office of the Private Secretary to His Excellency the Viceroy. (Dated 15 December 1930.)
Stanley Webb-Johnson, Assistant Solicitor to the Government of India. (Dated 15 December 1930.)
Khan Bahadur Taj Mohammed Khan, of Badreshi, Contractor, Supply and Transport Corps, Nowshera, North-West Frontier Province.
Herbert Gordon Lang, Indian Police Service, Superintendent of Police, Great Indian Peninsula and Madras and Southern Mahratta Railways, Poona, Bombay. (Dated 15 December 1930.)
Lieutenant-Colonel John William McCoy, Indian Medical Service (retired), Civil Surgeon and Superintendent of Jail, Sylhet, Assam. (Dated 15 December 1930.)
Rai Bahadur Charu Chandra Mukharji, Deputy Commissioner, Manbhum, Bihar and Orissa. (Dated 15 December 1930.)
Khan Bahadur Kavasji Jamshedji Petigara  Indian Police Service, Deputy Commissioner of Police, Bombay.
Raja Bahadur Venkatrama Reddy, Commissioner of Police, Hyderabad City and Suburbs, His Exalted Highness the Nizam's Government, Hyderabad, Deccan. (Dated 15 December 1930.)
James Alexander Scott, Indian Police Service, Principal, Punjab Police Training School, Phillaur, Punjab.
Rana Umanath Baksh Singh, of Thalrai (Khajurgaon), Rai Bareli District, United Provinces. (Dated 15 December 1930.)
Chandulal Madhavlal Trivedi, Indian Civil Service, Deputy Commissioner, Nagpur, Central Provinces.
Oliver Ethelbert Windle, Indian Police Service, District Superintendent of Police, Madras.

Honorary Officers
Malietoa Tanumafili of the Territory of Western Samoa. For services to the Government of the Dominion of New Zealand.

Member of the Order of the British Empire (MBE)
Military Division
Royal Navy
Engineer Lieutenant-Commander Reginald Charles Drew 
Commissioned Wardmaster George Hewlett Toleroy Wilsmore  (Retired).

Army
Lieutenant (acting Captain) Syed Salleh Alsagoff, Penang and Province Wellesley Volunteer Corps, Straits Settlements Volunteer Force.
Regimental Quartermaster-Sergeant James Valentine Booth, Malay States Volunteer Regiment.
Warrant Officer Class II, Company Sergeant Major David Boyd  late Survey Battalion, Royal Engineers.
Regimental Sergeant-Major William Harold Edmonds, Hong Kong Volunteer Defence Corps.
Conductor Benjamin Massey, Indian Army Ordnance Corps, Attached Headquarters, Southern Command, India.
Battery Sergeant-Major Thomas Oswald Mayhew, Singapore Volunteer Corps, Straits Settlements Volunteer Force.

Civil Division
Ernest Alderson, Assessor and Collector of Taxes, Board of Inland Revenue.
Harriet Amelia Alsop. Lately Matron, St. Mary Abbots Hospital, Kensington.
Alexander Smith Anderson, Manager of the Norwich Union Life. Insurance Society in Aberdeen. A member of the Aberdeen, Banff and Kincardineshire War Pensions Committee.
Major George Frederick Anderson  Staff Officer, Mines Department, Board of Trade.
Alexandro Emanuel James Arrighi, Higher Executive Officer, Board of Inland Revenue.
Stephen Benjamin Valentine Bailey, Staff Officer (Taxes), Board of Inland Revenue.
Williamina Mclntosh Barclay. Lately Nurse at St. Kilda.
Richard Bell, Lately Assistant Accountant, Grade I, War Office.
Frederick Montague, Bilby Registrar of Births, Deaths and Marriages for, the Finsbury District of London.
Edith Blunt. Honorary Secretary, Association of Women Prison Visitors.
Captain Francis Edwin Boaz  Chief Quantity Surveyor, Imperial War Graves Commission, France.
Councillor Thomas Judson Brooks  Chairman of the Wakefield, Pontefract and District War Pensions Committee.
Myra Ann Bushnell. Matron, Joint Fever Hospital, Wrexham.
Charles Campbell, Sub-Inspecting Officer of Railways, Ministry of Transport.
Lilian Mary Clapham. Staff Clerk, Ministry of Labour.
Minnie Constance Clarke. Honorary Secretary, Wimbledon Savings Committee.
William Clayton, Headmaster, Appleton Roebuck Council School, West Riding of Yorkshire.
Charles Coates, Head of Section, H.M. Office of Works.
William Harrison Cowlishaw, Architect, Imperial War Graves Commission, France.
Agnes Emma Cox. Superintendent of the Female Exchange Staff of the London Telephone Service.
William Henry Creelman, Examiner of Naval Ordnance Work, Woolwich.
Frederick Walter Crothall. For services in connection with Empire Marketing.
Stuart Davey, Staff Officer, Air Ministry. 
Albert Edward Davis, Superintendent, Metropolitan Police.
Sarah Dickenson  Member of the Manchester and District War Pensions Committee. For some time Chairman of the Children's Sub-Committee.
Major Thomas Joseph Edwards. Retired Officer, War Office.
Edgar Daniel Fear. Honorary Organiser for Norfolk, National Savings Committee.
Jean Gray. Matron of the Leicester and Leicestershire Maternity Hospital.
Councillor Ernest Hamlin. Vice-Chairman, Holborn Savings Committee.
Florence Annie James. Headmistress, Linden Road Infants School, Gloucester.
Morton Jewell, Staff Officer, Dominions Office and Colonial Office. 
James Gilbert Jewels, Headmaster, Stephenson Memorial School, Wallsend.
Charles Thomas Johnston, Superintendent and Deputy Chief Constable, Greenock Burgh Police.
Margaret Jean Keay. For ten years Honorary Secretary, Derby Savings Committee.
Harold Vaughan Kenyon  Commandant, Metropolitan Special Constabulary
William Lamerton, Principal Foreman of Storehouses, Naval Store Department, Admiralty. 
Eliza Jane Winifredia Mary (May) Langford. Member of the East Ham and Barking War Pensions Committee. For some time Chairman of the Children's Sub-Committee.
Charles William Mayer, Secretary and Superintendent (non medical), Mental Deficiency Institution, Starcross.
Captain Reginald Eric Jenners Moore. Intelligence Officer in the Exhibitions Division of the Department of Overseas Trade.
Horace Leonard Nicholls, Higher Executive Officer, Ministry of Pensions.
Frederic James Pearce, Staff Officer (Grade II), Ministry of Transport.
Robert Syme Peddie, Postmaster Elgin, Morayshire.
Thomas Edgar Pilgrim. Honorary Secretary, Aldeburgh Savings Committee.
Ralph Joseph Pym Pollard, Honorary Secretary, Penrith Savings Committee.
Clarence Woodburn Pugh, Honorary Secretary, Devizes Savings Committee.
Mabel Caroline Rauscher. Assistant to the Controller of the Clearing Office, Board of Trade.
Edward Roberts  Lately Headmaster of Kingussie Secondary School.
William Rushworth, Member of the South West Lancashire War Pensions Committee.
Captain John Sandilands. Librarian, Royal Artillery Institution.
Percival George Slade, Staff Officer, H.M. Treasury.
John Henry Moore Smedley, . Chief Port Sanitary Inspector, Liverpool.
George Smith, Engineer, H.M. Office of Works.
Russell Edwin Stanley, Senior Staff Officer, Ministry of Agriculture., and Fisheries.
Thomas Robert Thirtle. Postmaster, House of Commons.
Ernest Arthur Warner, Chief Inspector of Ships Provisions, Board of Trade.
William Henry Whiteley, Principal Clerk, Ministry of Pensions.
Victor Ernest Wilkins  Assistant Principal, Ministry of Agriculture and Fisheries.,

Diplomatic Service And Overseas List
William John Richard Andrews, Superintendent of Publicity, Sudan Government Railways.
John Deans  lately Acting British Vice-Consul at New York.
Geraldine Forster, Social and Education worker in Khartoum.
Robert John Knox, British Vice-Consul at Buenos Aires.
Thomas Hilary Naftel, British Vice-Consul at Aguiles.
Fred Stirk, Manager, Omdurman Technical School.
John Campbell Thomson, Accountant at His Majesty's Embassy at Washington.

British India
William Henry Prior de la Hey, Personal Assistant to the Military Secretary to His Excellency the Viceroy.
Bakhtawar Singh Dillon, Colonel in the Patiala State Forces, Commandant, 1st Patiala (Rajendra) Lancers. (Dated 15 December 1930.)
Eric Henry Frost, of the Imperial Secretariat Service, Officiating Superintendent, Home Department, Government of India.
Khan Bahadur Saiyid Ghulam Hasnain, Deputy Superintendent of Police, Cawnpore, United Provinces.
Khan Bahadur Darashah Dhanjishah Kothawala, Deputy Superintendent of Police, Criminal Investigation Department, Bombay. (Dated 15 December 1930.)
Frank Henry Langley, Civilian Officer of the Military Farms Department, Peshawar, North-West Frontier Province.
Edgar Samuel Lewis, Punjab Civil Service, Additional District Magistrate, Lahore, Punjab. (Dated 15 December 1930.)
Homewell Lyngdoh, Assam Medical Service, Civil Surgeon, Nowgong, Assam. (Dated 15 December 1930.)
Robert William Mantle, Public Works Department, New Delhi. (Dated 15 December 1930.)
Arnold Christopher Mayberry, Deputy Superintendent of Police, Jubbulpore, Central Provinces. (Dated 15 December 1930.)
James Joseph Angelo Piner, of the Imperial Secretariat Service, Superintendent, Foreign and Political Department, Government of India. (Dated 15 December 1930.)
Saiyid Mujibur Rab, Indian Police Service, Officiating Superintendent of Police, Bihar and Orissa.
Lachlan Macpherson Ryley, Assistant Inspector of Small Arms (Armourers), Ishapore, Bengal. (Dated 15 December 1930.)
Raja Mukund Singh, of Hardoi, Jalaun District, United Provinces.
Allan Carmichael Blackburn Stout, Telegraph Master, Peshawar, North-West Frontier Province. (Dated 15 December 1930.)
Edward Patrick Warner, Officiating Superintendent of the Visapur Temporary Prison, Bombay. (Dated 15 December 1930.)
Alfred Charles Willis, Indian Service of Engineers, Executive Engineer, Mon Canals Division, Burma.

Colonies, Protectorates, etc.
Horatio Bacarisas, Assistant Treasurer and Accountant, Revenue Department, Gibraltar.
James Edward Todd Brathwaite, Chief Inland Revenue Officer, Grenada, Windward Islands.
Florence Gaskin Browne. For Social welfare services in Barbados.
John Fisher, Chief Fire Officer, Ministry of the Interior, Iraq.
Captain Francis George Leopold Holland, Headmaster, Educational Scheme, Gilbert and Ellice Islands Colony, Western Pacific.
Cyril Charles Arnold Jansz, Manager and Principal of St. John's College, Panadura; for services to education in Ceylon.
Audrey Jeffers. For social welfare services in Trinidad.
Arnold Robert Johnson, lately Senior District Engineer, Federated Malay States Railways.
Henry Meaden, Magistrate-Warden of Tobago, Colony of Trinidad and Tobago.
Lilian Mary Single; West African Nursing Staff, Matron, Nigeria.
Arthur James Stone, Registrar of the High Court and Administrator-General, Nyasaland Protectorate.
George Alves Vincent  Medical Superintendent, St. Ann's Lunatic Asylum, Trinidad.
Alfred Whittaker, lately Collector of Revenue, Wei-hai-Wei.

Members of the Order of the Companions of Honour (CH) 

Helena Maria Swanwick. First President, Women's International League (British Section). Formerly British Delegate to the Assembly of the League of Nations.
Jane Harriett Walker  Founder and Medical Superintendent of the East Anglian Sanatorium, Nayland, Suffolk. Founder and first President of the Medical Women's Federation.

Kaisar-i-Hind Medal

First Class
Mary Ronald Bisset  in charge Zenana Baptist Mission Hospital, Bhiwani, Punjab.
Evelyn Gedge, Head of the Settlement for University Women, Gamdevi, Bombay. 
Ellen Inglis, Social Servant of Church Missionary Society, Punjab. Sarala Ray  Bengal. 
Mary Daphne, Lady Stephenson, Bihar and Orissa.
Mohamed Ayoob, alias U Shwe Yun  Government Prosecutor, President, Municipal Committee, and Chairman, District Council, Mergui, Burma.
Frank Howard Oakley, Senior Partner of Messrs. Oakley, Bowden and Company, Madras.
Graham Colville Ramsay  Tea-garden Doctor, at present employed on malarial research work by the Ross Institute, Assam.
The Reverend Harry Hanson Weak  Mission, Garhwal, United Provinces.
The Venerable Archdeacon Edward Hamilton Whitley, Missionary of the Society for the Propagation of the Gospel, Archdeacon of Chota Nagpur, Bihar and Orissa.

Air Force Cross

Squadron Leader John Allan Cecil Wright  (Auxiliary Air Force).
Flight Lieutenant Gilbert Edward Nicholetts.
Flight Lieutenant Edward Simeon Colbeck Davis.

Air Force Medal
Sergeant Alfred Victor Bax.

King's Police Medal (KPM)
England and Wales
Lieutenant-Colonel Herbert Charles Metcalfe  Chief Constable of Somerset.
Captain John Alfred Unett  Chief Constable of Essex.
Frederick James Crawley, Chief Constable, Newcastle upon Tyne City Police Force.
Arthur Robert Ellerington, Chief Constable, St. Helens Borough Police Force.
Major Cedric Valentine Godfrey  Chief Constable, Salford City Police Force.
Owen Cyrenius Webb, Superintendent, Metropolitan Police Force.
William Trigg  Chief Superintendent and Deputy Chief Constable, Lincolnshire Constabulary.
James Taylor Burnett  Chief Superintendent, Birmingham City Police Force.
William Kenyon, Superintendent, Lancashire Constabulary.
Charles Matthew Turner, Superintendent, Bradford City Police Force.
William Burnham Fair, Chief Inspector, Metropolitan Police Force.
George Charles Colvin, Sergeant, Metropolitan Police Force.
Frederick George Muggridge, Sergeant, Metropolitan Police Force.
James Dunsmore Adamson, Constable, Metropolitan Police Force.
Robert Henry Baker, Constable, Metropolitan Police Force.
John Laidlaw Bertram, Constable, Metropolitan Police Force.
Alexander McLeod Irvine, Constable, Metropolitan Police Force.
Ernest Jacobi, Constable, Metropolitan Police Force.
Alfred Charles James, Constable, Metropolitan Police Force.
Thomas Jack Kenwood, Constable, Metropolitan Police Force.
Robert Henry Minnis, Constable, Metropolitan Police Force.
Dennis Henry Murphy, Constable, Metropolitan Police Force.
Walter Ernest Raymond, Constable, Metropolitan Police Force.
John Charles McCarthy, Constable, Bedfordshire Constabulary.
Robert Merchant, Constable, Essex Constabulary.
Tom James Smith, Chief Officer, St. Austell (Volunteer) Fire Brigade.
Arthur Henry Drake, Chief Officer, Coventry Fire Brigade.
Joseph James Moore, Senior Superintendent, London Fire Brigade.

His Majesty Has also graciously consented to the King's Police Medal being handed to the next-of-kin of the undermentioned officer, who was killed on duty on the 14th December, 1930, and would have received the decoration had he survived
Robert Little, Sergeant, Durham Constabulary.

Scotland
Captain Duncan Finlayson  Chief Constable of Ross and Cromarty.
Angus MacKinnon, Superintendent, Glasgow City Police Force.
Sinclair Mackay, Superintendent, Dumbartonshire Constabulary.
George McKay, Constable, Glasgow City Police Force.

Northern Ireland
William Charles Foster, Constable, Royal Ulster Constabulary.

Australia
Daniel Leo Beaty, Foot Constable, South Australian Police Force.
William Lancelot Dohoney, Foot Constable, South Australian Police Force.
Frederick Hector Lee, Motor Traffic Constable, South Australian Police Force.
John Albert Robertson, Motor Traffic Constable, South Australian Police Force.
William Roy Denison, Motor Traffic Constable, South Australian Police Force.
Russell Sylvester Moore Walters, Motor Traffic Constable, South Australian Police Force.
Percy Edgcumbe Holloway, Motor Traffic Constable, South Australian Police Force.

Union of South Africa
Samuel Hendrik White, Detective Constable, South African Police Force.
Gerhardus Barend Walters, Constable, South African Police Force.

British India
Sir Patrick Aloysius Kelly  Commissioner of Police, Bombay. (bar to the King's Police Medal)
George John Adamson, Inspector, Calcutta Police. (bar to the King's Police Medal)
Rai Sahib Jagdeo Prashad Singh, Subedar, Military Police, Bhagalpur. (bar to the King's Police Medal)
Frederick Lionel Mullaly, Deputy Commissioner, Madras City Police.
Rao Bahadur Mangalore Venkatappa, Assistant Commissioner, Madras City Police.
Manikkam Michael Chelladurai, Officiating Inspector, Madras City Police.
Eugene Roxton Upshon, Sub-Inspector, Madras City Police.
Thomas Browning, Sergeant-Major, Madras City Police.
Allan Walton, Sergeant, Madras City Police.
Kalftyath Achutha Menon, Head Constable, Madras City Police.
Vonamamula Narasimhalu Krishnaswami Nayudu, Constable, Madras City Police.
Muhammad Lutfullah Hussain, Sowar, Madras City Police.
Ghulam Mahomed Mohazir, Sub-Inspector, Madras City Police.
Keshav Bhimrao Bendigeri, Head Constable, Great Indian Peninsula Railway Police.
Tom Robinson, Officiating District Superintendent of Police, Bombay Presidency.
Paul Burgman Wilkins, Assistant Superintendent, Bombay Police.
Charles Henry de Vere Moss, Assistant Superintendent, Bombay Police.
John Cotton Farmer, Deputy Inspector-General, Bengal Police.
Daniel Mulcahy, Sergeant, Calcutta Police.
Frederick Harry Burr, Sergeant, Calcutta Police.
Felix O'Hara, Sergeant, Calcutta Police.
Manindra Chandra Pal, Constable, Bengal Police.
Jadu Nandan Singh, Constable, Eastern Bengal and Assam-Bengal Railways Police.
Archibald Douglas Gordon, Deputy Commissioner of Police, Calcutta.
Frederick William Kidd, Superintendent of Police, Midnapore, Bengal.
Promode Mohan Chakrabartti, Officiating Deputy Superintendent of Police, Intelligence Branch, Criminal Investigation Department, Bengal.
Yakub Ali Khan, Constable, Bengal Police.
Pir Khan, Constable, United Provinces Police.
Munshi Mahmud-ul-Hasan, Sub-Inspector, United Provinces Police.
Horace Williamson  Indian Police Service, United Provinces.
Sayed Ahmad Shah, Inspector, Punjab Police.
Ram Chand, Constable, Punjab Police.
Abdul Karim, Constable, Punjab Police.
Alam Khan, Constable, Punjab Police.
Ronald Arthur Charles Hill, Superintendent, Punjab Police.
Ali Muhammad Shah, Constable, Punjab Police.
Nasib Khan, Constable, Punjab Police.
Najabat Ali, Constable, Punjab Police.
Captain Lewis Eric MacGregor  Burma Military Police.
Chanan Khan, Constable, Burma Police.
Godwin Edward Banwell  Officiating Superintendent, Burma Police.
Henry Raymond Alexander, Superintendent, Burma Police.
Brij Behari Lai, Sub-Inspector, Bihar and Orissa Police.
Francis Steuart McNamara, Deputy Inspector-General, Bihar and Orissa Police.
Ram Sarup Singh, Constable, Bihar and Orissa Police.
Rambilas Singh, Constable, Bihar and Orissa Police.
Robert Douglas Kiallmark Ninnis, Superintendent, Bihar and Orissa Police.
Malcolm Ayres Mackenzie  Superintendent, Bihar and Orissa Police.
Ganesh, Constable, Central Provinces Police.
Bhagirath, Constable Central Provinces Police.
Charles Carter Chitham, Deputy Inspector-General, Central Provinces Police.
Archibald Gifford Scott, Superintendent, Central Provinces Police.
Eric Fitzroy Neilson, Superintendent, Central Provinces Police.
Harold Beaumont, Superintendent of Police, Sylhet, Assam.
Bashir Ahmed Khan, Inspector, North-West Frontier Province Police.
Nawab, Constable, North-West Frontier Province Railway Police.
Raz Muhammad Khan (Tarakzai Mohmand), Jemadar, North-West Frontier Province Constabulary.
Lal Din (Tarakzai Mohmand), Naik, North-West Frontier Province Constabulary.
Reginald Castelman Jeffreys, late Senior Superintendent, Delhi Police.
Muhammad Afzal, Foot Constable, Delhi Police.
Sardar Ragibhir Singh, Inspector-General of Police, Patiala State.

His Majesty Has also graciously consented to the King's Police Medal being handed to the next-of-kin of the undermentioned officer, who was killed on duty on the 14th December, 1930, and would have received the decoration had he survived:
Sharfuddin, Constable, United Provinces Police.

 Colonies, Protectorates and Mandated Territories 
Ernest Gilbert, Sergeant, Civil Police Force, Gibraltar.
Walter Kent, Assistant Superintendent, Hong Kong Police.
Carmelo Maria Saliba, Inspector, Malta Police.
Muttugalage Don Warliano, Constable, Ceylon Police.
J. N. Jordan, Constable, Northern Rhodesia Police.

British Empire Medal (BEM)
Military Division
For Gallantry
Able Seaman George Willet Harrison. Citation: "On the occasion of a bad accident that occurred on board H.M.S. Hood at Portsmouth on the 15th February, 1930, when Dockyard workmen were engaged in opening up for inspection the starboard after bulge compartments, a Shipwright named Langford entered through the manhole into a compartment contaminated with carbon monoxide and was overcome and collapsed. He was alive when brought out but died without recovering consciousness. As soon as the alarm was given a rescue party entered the bulge, but found great difficulty in locating Langford owing to the very bad atmosphere and the absence of effective lighting. The party had gas-masks but these were ineffective against carbon monoxide gas. Notwithstanding these difficulties, however, Able Seaman Harrison made his way through successive compartments and at great personal risk, continued his search and, with assistance, eventually brought Langford out. On being brought out, Harrison himself was in a state of collapse."

For Meritorious Service
Lance Corporal Lawrence Edward Cromey, 2nd Battalion, The Bedfordshire and Hertfordshire Regiment.
Staff Sergeant Cecil Lockyer, Royal Army Ordnance Corps.
Flight Sergeant Edward Victor Hibberd, Royal Air Force.

Civil Division
For Meritorious Service
Henry Creed, Office Keeper in the Dominions Office and the Colonial Office.
Thomas Greensmith, Inspector of Shipping, H.M. War Department Fleet.
Sydney George Thomas Lane, Shipwright, H.M. Dockyard, Portsmouth.
James McManus, Shipwright, H.M. Dockyard, Portsmouth.
Alfred John Prince, Head Gardener and Caretaker, Imperial War Graves Commission, Belgium.
William Webster, Inspector, Edinburgh City Police Force.
Bertram O'Brien, Inspector of Police, Madras City, Madras.
George Thomas Richard Smith, Officiating Inspector of Police, in charge of Armed Reserve, Madras City, Madras.
Muhammad Ghouse Chida Sahib Bahadur, Inspector of Police, Madras.
M. Muhammad Sadiq, Sub-Inspector of Police, Punjab.
Nanak Chand, Sub-Inspector of Police, Punjab.
Hasan Tahsin, Chief Cavass at H.M. Consulate General at Smyrna.

Royal Red Cross (RRC) 
Second Class
Superintending Sister Nora Evelyn James.

References

New Year Honours
1931 in Australia
1931 in Canada
1931 in India
1931 in New Zealand
1931 in the United Kingdom
1931 awards